Sparkle is the 1998 self–titled debut album by American singer Sparkle. It was released on May 19, 1998, through Interscope Records and was entirely produced by her former mentor R. Kelly. The album was a success in large part to the Sparkle–R. Kelly duet lead single "Be Careful", which peaked at number three on the US Rhythmic Top 40 and topped the US Hot R&B/Hip-Hop Airplay chart. The album itself peaked at number three on the Billboard 200 and was certified gold by the RIAA on December 7, 2000.

Further singles "Time to Move On" and "Lovin' You" were also released as singles, but did not make any Billboard charts.

Critical reception
Entertainment Weekly gave the album a grade of B+, writing: "Unlike her wannabe-diva peers, this R. Kelly protegee remembers what the 'B' in R&B stands for....R. Kelly surrounds her with blaxploitation-vintage wah-wah guitars, haunting strings, and blue-collar blues; the resulting soul digs far deeper than Kelly's usual bump'n' grind".

Track listing
All track written, produced and arranged by R. Kelly. 

Samples
"Time to Move On" samples from "Intimate Friends" by Eddie Kendricks.
"Lovin' You" is a cover of "Loving You" by Minnie Riperton.
"Good Life" samples from "Good Times" by Chic.

Credits

Jason Bacher – assistant engineer
Percy Bady – keyboards
Rick Behrens – assistant engineer, engineer, mixing assistant
Chris Brickley – assistant engineer, engineer, mixing assistant, programming
Cam'ron – rap vocals
Lafayette Carthon, Jr. – keyboards
Trey Fratt – assistant engineer
Stephen George – engineer, mixing, programming
Keith Henderson – guitar
Cynthia Jernigan – backing vocals
Mark Johnson – mixing assistant
R. Kelly – arranger, executive producer, mixing, producer, vocals
Jeff Lane – mixing assistant
Ron Lowe – assistant engineer, engineer, mixing assistant
Mr. Lee – mixing, programming
Peter Mokran – head engineer, mixing, programmer
Nature – rap vocals
Joshua Shapera – engineer
Sparkle – vocals
Martin Stebbing – engineer, programming
Ed Tinley – assistant engineer
Poke & Tone – mixing
Jeff Vereb – assistant engineer, mixing assistant

Charts

Weekly charts

Year-end charts

Certifications

References

1998 debut albums
Interscope Records albums
Sparkle (singer) albums